The Hanoi Exhibition (Exposition de Hanoi) was a world's fair held in Hanoi in then French Indochina between November 16, 1902, and February 15 or 16, 1903.

Context
Hanoi had become the capital of French Indochina earlier in 1902 replacing Saigon. Earlier activities to mark the change included a festival on 26 February 1902 attended by emperor Thành Thái and the governor general Paul Doumer and the opening of the Paul Doumer (now Long Biên) Bridge. The exhibition was the idea of Paul Doumer.

Grand Palais de l'Exposition

The site of the fair was the racecourse established in the early 1890s, and its main building was the Grand Palais de l'Exposition designed by Adolphe Bussy.

The preparation for the fair, especially the construction of the exhibition palace, left Hanoi's budget in deficit for a decade.

When the Japanese took over Vietnam, they based their military and supply in the palace. Later, air raids at the end of World War II completely destroyed the building.

The modern site of the palace now stands the Friendship Cultural Palace, a concert venue in southern Hoàn Kiếm District.

Participation
The fair showed products from France and her colonies, and from other territories in Southeast Asia: , Burma, Ceylon, China, Dutch Indies, Formosa (now Taiwan), French Indo-China, India, Japan, Korea, Malaysia, Malacca, the Philippines, Siam and Singapore.

Exhibits
As well as country displays there was a machine gallery, a La Grand Roue amusement ride,  and art in the French Section of Fine Arts including work by Carolus-Duran.

References

External links
  Poster for the exhibition
  Hanoi postcards from turn of the 19th 20th century including several from the exhibition

1900s in Vietnam
1902 festivals
1902 in Asia
1903 festivals
1903 in Asia
French colonial empire
World's fairs in Asia
Colonial exhibitions